Adams Island is the second largest island of New Zealand's Auckland Islands archipelago.

Geography

The channel is the remnant of the crater of an extinct volcano, with Adams Island, and the southern part of Auckland Island forming the crater rim.

Two large indentations, Bolton's Bay and Fly Harbour, are the most prominent features of the island's south coast, both in the south east.

Important Bird Area
The island is part of the Auckland Island group Important Bird Area (IBA), identified as such by BirdLife International because of the significance of the group as a breeding site for several species of seabirds as well as the endemic Auckland shag, Auckland teal, Auckland rail and Auckland snipe.

See also
Auckland Islands
 Composite Antarctic Gazetteer
 List of Antarctic and subantarctic islands
 List of islands of New Zealand
 New Zealand subantarctic islands
 Scientific Committee on Antarctic Research

References

Islands of the Auckland Islands
Important Bird Areas of the Auckland Islands
Volcanic islands of New Zealand